Paul Préboist (21 February 1927 – 4 March 1997) was a French actor. He appeared in more than hundred films, mostly in supporting roles, and is best known as a comic actor.

Filmography

Theater

References

External links

Paul Préboist at Allmovie
 Biography, photos, film posters 

1927 births
1997 deaths
20th-century French male actors
20th-century French comedians
French male film actors
French comedians
French male stage actors
French male television actors
Male actors from Marseille